Régis Blachère (30 June 1900 – 7 August 1973) was a French orientalist and translator of the Qur'an.

Bibliography 
1975: Analecta, Institut français de Damas, Damas, 1975.
2002: Le Coran, Presses universitaires de France, (Que sais-je?, n° 1245), 
1956: Dans les pas de Mahomet, Hachette.
1960: Dictionnaire arabe-français-anglais (Langue classique et moderne), .
1967: Dictionnaire arabe-français-anglais Arabic/French/English Dictionary - Langue classique et moderne, Maisonneuve et Larose.
1958: Éléments de l'arabe classique, Quatrième édition revue et corrigée, G.-P. Maisonneuve.
1970: Exercices d'arabe classique, Adrien Maisonneuve, 
 Extraits des principaux géographes arabes du Moyen Age. 
 Grammaire de l'arabe classique, Maisonneuve et Larose, 
1952: Histoire de la littérature arabe : des origines à la fin du XVe siècle de J.-C., Volume 1, Adrien Maisonneuve,  
1964: Histoire de la littérature arabe : des origines à la fin du XVe siècle de J.-C., Volume 2, Adrien Maisonneuve, 
1964: Histoire de la littérature arabe : des origines à la fin du XVe siècle de J.-C., Volume 3,  Adrien Maisonneuve, 
 Introduction au Coran, Maisonneuve et Larose, 
1949–1977: Le Coran. Traduction selon un essai de reclassement des sourates, G.-P. Maisonneuve.
1952: Le problème de Mahomet - Essai de biographie critique du fondateur de l'Islam, un volume de 135 pages, Presses universitaires de France.

People from Montrouge
1900 births
1973 deaths
French Arabists
Translators of the Quran into French
Academic staff of the École pratique des hautes études
Members of the Académie des Inscriptions et Belles-Lettres
20th-century French translators